In mathematics, a diagonal form is an algebraic form (homogeneous polynomial) without cross-terms involving different indeterminates. That is, it is

for some given degree m.

Such forms F, and the hypersurfaces F = 0 they define in projective space, are very special in geometric terms, with many symmetries. They also include famous cases like the Fermat curves, and other examples well known in the theory of Diophantine equations.

A great deal has been worked out about their theory: algebraic geometry, local zeta-functions via Jacobi sums, Hardy-Littlewood circle method.

Examples
 is the unit circle in P2
 is the unit hyperbola in P2.
 gives the Fermat cubic surface in P3 with 27 lines. The 27 lines in this example are easy to describe explicitly: they are the 9 lines of the form (x : ax : y : by) where a and b are fixed numbers with cube −1,  and their 18 conjugates under permutations of coordinates.

 gives a K3 surface in P3.

Homogeneous polynomials
Algebraic varieties